The 2005 EV1.net Houston Bowl was the sixth and final edition of the college football bowl games and was played at Reliant Stadium in Houston, Texas. The game pitted the Iowa State Cyclones from the Big 12 Conference and the TCU Horned Frogs from the Mountain West Conference (MWC). The game was the final competition of the 2005 football season for each team and resulted in a 27–24 TCU victory.

Game summary

References

Houston Bowl
Houston Bowl
Iowa State Cyclones football bowl games
TCU Horned Frogs football bowl games
December 2005 sports events in the United States
Houston Bowl
2005 in Houston